Sahi may refer to:
 Sahi (software), a software testing tool
 Sahi clan, a social group of South Asia

People with the name 
 Amarjit Singh Sahi, Indian politician from Punjab
 Bhanu Pratap Sahi, Indian politician from Jharkhand
 Chaudhry Muhammad Afzal Sahi (born 1949), Pakistani politician from Punjab
 Deepa Sahi (born 1962), Indian actress and producer
 Fateh Bahadur Sahi, a former ruler of Hathwa state
 Ghulam Rasool Sahi (born 1944), Pakistani politician from Punjab
 K. Rai Sahi, Indian Canadian executive
 Krishna Sahi, Indian politician from Bihar
 Nusrat Iqbal Sahi (born 1950), Pakistani athlete
 Sukhjit Kaur Sahi, Indian politician from Punjab
 Sahi Ram (born 1959), Indian politician from Delhi

See also 
 
 Sahi school health programme, in the UAE
 Sahih, a term in Islam
 Shahi (disambiguation)
 Šahy, a town in Slovakia